La paloma is a moth in the family Crambidae. It was described by Stanisław Błeszyński in 1966. It is found in Colombia.

References

Crambini
Moths described in 1966
Moths of South America